Baspa melampus, the Indian red flash is a species of blue (Lycaenidae) butterfly found in South-East Asia.

Range
The butterfly occurs in Sri Lanka and in India from South India to Orissa, and, in the north from Murree to Kumaon. The range extends to Peninsular Malaysia, Singapore, Sumatra, Borneo and Bangka.

Taxonomy
The butterfly was previously classified as Rapala melampus (Stoll, 1781). It is also sometimes treated as a subspecies of Rapala iarbus.

Status
In 1932, William Harry Evans described the species as not rare.

See also
List of butterflies of India (Lycaenidae)

Cited references

References
  
 
 
 
 

Baspa (butterfly)
Butterflies of Borneo
Butterflies described in 1781